Braxton Hoyett (born February 5, 1996) is an American football defensive end who is a free agent. He played college football for Mississippi State.

Professional career

Tennessee Titans
Hoyett was signed by the Tennessee Titans as an undrafted free agent on May 10, 2019. He was waived on August 30, 2019 during final roster cuts.

Kansas City Chiefs
Hoyett was signed by the Kansas City Chiefs to their practice squad on October 1, 2019. He remained on practice squad for the rest of the season and as the Chiefs won Super Bowl LIV against the San Francisco 49ers.

Hoyett re-signed with the Chiefs on February 5, 2020. He was waived on July 29, 2020, but re-signed on August 8. He was waived during final roster cuts on September 5, 2020, but was signed to the team's practice squad the next day. He was elevated to the active roster on September 19 for the team's Week 2 game against the Los Angeles Chargers, and reverted to the practice squad after the game. He was placed on the practice squad/COVID-19 list by the team on November 10. He was restored to the practice squad and subsequently released on November 17.

Baltimore Ravens
On December 4, 2020, Hoyett was signed to the Baltimore Ravens' practice squad. He was released on December 15, but re-signed to the practice squad the next day. He was released again on January 12, 2021. On January 18, 2021, Hoyett signed a reserve/futures contract with the Ravens. He was waived with an injury settlement on June 2, 2021.

New Orleans Saints
On December 22, 2021, Hoyett was signed to the New Orleans Saints practice squad. He signed a reserve/future contract with the Saints on January 11, 2022. He was waived on May 11, 2022.

References

External links
 Baltimore Ravens bio
 Kansas City Chiefs bio
 Mississippi State Bulldogs bio

1996 births
Living people
American football defensive tackles
Baltimore Ravens players
Kansas City Chiefs players
Mississippi State Bulldogs football players
New Orleans Saints players
People from Pelham, Alabama
Players of American football from Alabama
Tennessee Titans players